Mary Soames, Baroness Soames,  (15 September 1922 31 May 2014) was an English author. The youngest of the five children of Winston Churchill and his wife, Clementine, she worked for public organisations including the Red Cross and the Women's Voluntary Service from 1939 to 1941, and joined the Auxiliary Territorial Service in 1941. She was the wife of Conservative politician Christopher Soames.

Biography

Mary Spencer-Churchill was born in London, in the same week as her father, Winston Churchill, purchased  Chartwell, a country house in Kent; she was brought up there, attending local schools. She worked for the Red Cross and the Women's Voluntary Service from 1939 to 1941, and joined the Auxiliary Territorial Service in 1941 with which she served in London, Belgium and Germany in mixed anti-aircraft batteries, rising to the rank of Junior Commander (equivalent to Captain). She accompanied her father as aide-de-camp on several of his overseas journeys, including his post-VE trip to Potsdam, where he met Harry S. Truman and Joseph Stalin. In 1945, she was appointed a Member of the Order of the British Empire (MBE), in recognition of meritorious military services.

She served many public organisations, such as the International Churchill Society, as a Patron; Church Army and Churchill Houses; and chaired the Royal National Theatre Board of Trustees between 1989 and 1995. She was Patron of the National Benevolent Fund for the Aged.

She accompanied her husband, Christopher Soames, on his foreign postings as an Ambassador and/or Governor: to Paris (during 1968-1972) where she resided at Hotel de Charost, ranking alongside Diana Cooper in the annals of keen ambassadresses, and to Rhodesia.

A successful author, Lady Soames wrote an acclaimed biography of her mother, Clementine Churchill, in 1979. She offered insights into the Churchill family to various biographers, prominently including Sir Martin Gilbert, who became the authorised biographer of Sir Winston Churchill after the death of Churchill's son, Randolph, in 1968. Additionally, she published a book of letters between Sir Winston and Lady Churchill, editing the letters as well as providing bridging material that placed the letters in personal, family, and historical context.  In 2012, her memoirs, based upon her diaries from childhood up to the time of her marriage, were published under the title A Daughter's Tale.

In 1980, Lady Soames was promoted to Dame Commander of the Order of the British Empire (DBE) for her public service, particularly in Rhodesia.

In 1992, Soames appeared on BBC Radio 4's Desert Island Discs. Her chosen book was Memoirs from Beyond the Grave by Chateaubriand and her luxury item was a supply of fine Havana cigars. She chose as her favourite record a movement from Beethoven's Pastoral Symphony, which evoked the joy of returning to the countryside for her, a devoted countrywoman.

One of her more notable public appearances came on 29 April 2002 when she dined with the Queen at Downing Street as part of the Golden Jubilee celebrations, alongside Prime Minister Tony Blair, and the four surviving former prime ministers at the time, as well as several relatives of other deceased prime ministers.

She was made a Lady Companion of the Order of the Garter (LG) on 23 April 2005, and was invested on 13 June at Windsor Castle. She used the insignia worn by her father, Winston Churchill, who was made a Knight Companion of the Order of the Garter in 1953.

Family

Mary married the Conservative politician Christopher Soames (later created Baron Soames) in 1947 and they had five children:

Death

On 31 May 2014, Lady Soames died at her home in London at the age of 91 following a short illness. Her ashes are buried next to those of her husband within the Churchill plot at St Martin's Church, Bladon, near Woodstock, Oxfordshire. Since 24 September 1982, with the death of her sister Sarah, she had been the last surviving child of Winston Churchill.

Six months after her death, on 17 December 2014, Sotheby's London auctioned 255 items out of her collection on behalf of her heirs, including paintings by and memorabilia attached to her father. According to Sotheby's, the sale "realised an outstanding total of £15,441,822, well above pre-sale expectations of £3.6-5.5 million."

Arms

Bibliography
Books written by Mary Soames (titles may vary between UK and US editions):
Clementine Churchill: The Biography of a Marriage (1979)
Family Album: A Personal Selection from Four Generations of Churchills (1982)
The Profligate Duke: George Spencer Churchill, Fifth Duke of Marlborough, and His Duchess (1987)
Winston Churchill: His Life as a Painter (1990)
Speaking For Themselves: The Private Letters of Sir Winston and Lady Churchill (1999)
Clementine Churchill: The Revised and Updated Biography (2005)
A Daughter's Tale: The Memoir of Winston and Clementine Churchill's Youngest Child (2012)

References

External links

Booknotes interview with Soames on Winston & Clementine: The Personal Letters of the Churchills, 2 May 1999.
 
The Papers of Lady Soames held at Churchill Archives Centre

1922 births
2014 deaths
Mary Soames, Baroness Soames
Winston Churchill
British baronesses
Children of prime ministers of the United Kingdom
Dames Commander of the Order of the British Empire
Fellows of the Royal Society of Literature
Auxiliary Territorial Service officers
Ladies Companion of the Garter
English biographers
English memoirists
English people of American descent
British women memoirists
Women biographers
20th-century British women writers
20th-century British non-fiction writers
Burials at St Martin's Church, Bladon
Daughters of life peers
Spouses of life peers
Wives of knights